Dr. L. Thomas Strong III is the Dean of Leavell College at New Orleans Baptist Theological Seminary and teaches New Testament and Greek in Leavell College. He serves as senior pastor of Metairie Baptist Church in Metairie, Louisiana.

Education
New Orleans Baptist Theological Seminary, Ph.D., May 1992, Major in New Testament and Greek
New Orleans Baptist Theological Seminary, M.Div., May 1987, Major in Biblical Studies
Union University, B.A., May 1983, Major in Religion, Greek, and Sociology
 He was nominated and elected as "Mr. Union University, 1983.

Teaching experience
Dean, Leavell College of New Orleans Baptist Theological Seminary, August 1999-present.
Professor of New Testament and Greek, NOBTS, Aug. 1993-present
Contract Teacher/Adjunct Faculty, Biblical Studies Division, NOBTS, Aug. 1990-July 1991
Contract Teacher/Adjunct Faculty, School of Christian Training, NOBTS, Jan. 1988-June 1990
Adjunct Faculty, Religion Department, William Carey School of Nursing, Jan. 1989-Dec. 1989.

Honors
Received the Marvin Jones Award for Outstanding Churchmanship among the Faculty of NOBTS, presented May 2007.  This award is based on faculty nominations and vote in order to recognize faculty members who have served in an effective manner as a leader in a local church.
Received the Academic Excellence Medals for highest GPA in the fields of Religion, Greek, and Sociology from Union University at time of graduation, May 1983.
Graduated from Union University in May 1983 Magna Cum Laude.

Fellowships
Fellow, Dr. Jerry Breazeale, NOBTS, Aug. 1986-June 1990
Fellow, Dr. Gerald Stevens, NOBTS, Aug. 1988-Dec. 1988

Teaching specializations
"The Significance of the `Knowledge of God’ in the Epistles of Paul", NOBTS, Ph.D. Diss., May 1992
Collator, International Greek New Testament Project, 1993-present
"Mentoring in the Seminary Community." Ola Farmer Lenaz Lecture. Presented at NOBTS, May 20, 1999 and at the International Mentorign Association Meeting in Atlanta, GA on April 16, 1999.

Ministry experience
Senior Pastor, Metairie Baptist Church, [Metairie, Louisiana], March 2005 – present
Interim Pastor, Metairie Baptist Church, [Metairie, Louisiana], May 2003-March 2005
Interim Pastor, Westside Baptist Church, Ponchatoula, Louisiana, Oct. 1994-1995
Interim Pastor, Enon Baptist Church, Franklinton, Louisiana, July 1993-Dec. 1993
Pastor, Enon Baptist Church, Franklinton, LA, Nov. 1989-July 1993
Baptist Student Union Director and Semester Missionary, Wayne State University, Detroit, MI, Aug. 1983-May 1984
Short Term Missionary, Burkina Faso, West Africa, Jan. 1983
Short Term Missionary, Hurlock, Maryland, May - Aug. 1980
He was a Deacon, Sunday School Teacher, Coordinator of Discipleship at his previous church.

Publications
"An Essential Unity," The Theological Educator, Fall 1996
"Contrasts: Luke 18," The Theological Educator, Fall 1997
"Mentoring in a Seminary Community," The Proceedings of the International Mentoring Association, Fall 1999
Two Articles in Eerdman's Bible Dictionary
"Roman Emperor Claudius," The Bible Illustrator, Fall 1998

External sources and links
 Disciplining Christians 
 Faculty Profile 
 Leveall College 

American Christian theologians
Union University alumni
People from Metairie, Louisiana